Doris Evans McGinty (died April 5, 2005) was a professor in the Department of Music at Howard University from 1947 until 1991. McGinty was chair of the department for eight years, and contributed to numerous publications, including the New Grove Dictionary of American Music, Black Women in American Music, and the American Dictionary of Negro Biography. She was a contributing editor to The Black Perspective in Music from 1975 until her retirement in 1991.

McGinty was born in Washington, D.C., and is known for being the first American to receive a Doctorate of Musicology from Oxford University.

References 

Howard University faculty
People from Washington, D.C.
American musicologists
American women musicologists
Alumni of the University of Oxford
Women writers about music
2005 deaths
Year of birth missing
21st-century American women